Bath Central School District is a school district headquartered in Bath, New York.

The Village of Bath is in the district.  Towns that have portions in this district include Bath, Avoca, Cameron, Thurston, Urbana, and Wheeler.

History

Joseph Rumsey began being the superintendent circa 2013. He will retire effective June 30, 2023. Kelly Houck is scheduled to become the superintendent on that date.

Schools
 Haverling High School
 Dana Lyon Middle School
 Vernon E. Wightman Primary School

References

External links
 Bath Central School District 
School districts in New York (state)
Education in Steuben County, New York